A Szabadság (Freedom) is the official newspaper of the Hungarian Workers' Party. It was founded in 1989, as the successor of the former party newspaper, Népszabadság. It is a weekly which is published on Saturdays.

History
From 1989, the newspaper published continuously on a weekly basis, with the first issue released on 26 November 1989. Until 2006, it was black and white (except for the red header, later with pink colour). During this period, approximately 10,000 copies were sold per week. Between May 2006 and March 2007, the print version ceased, because of the financial problems of Munkáspárt. A Szabadság could only be read on the Internet, but with big, colourful pictures. The comeback was in March 2007, with a revised design, but with reduced number of copies. Around 3,000–4,000 copies were bought each week, of which 500 are in libraries and the Hungarian Parliament. From 2010 some pages returned to black and white.

Since October 2010, the newspaper was available again in selected news stands (mostly in the "Relay" and "Inmedio" network).

A Szabadság gets its income mostly from the subscribers. The newspaper also plays a role in helping the electoral fight of Munkáspárt, and describes its major events.

As of December 2022 the website of the newspaper aszabadsag.hu contains issues from 2019 only (nothing from before or after).

Content
Following Marxist–Leninist ideology, A Szabadság reports about the economy, politics and people. It  gives coverage of the international communist movement. It is a major information source for the members of the party.  

The newspaper costs 1,000 HUF per month, regardless of the number of monthly issues.  The year-end issue has 20 pages. The subscription fee supports the Workers' Party.

Editors
The first editor was Ferenc J. Horváth, later replaced by János Vida. The last editor was Judit Szabados. Between 2006 and 2007, a small group created the newspaper, led by Péter Székely. From 2010, the newspaper's editor is Zsuzsanna Fogarasi.

1989 establishments in Hungary
Communism in Hungary
Communist newspapers
Hungarian-language newspapers
Newspapers published in Budapest
Weekly newspapers published in Hungary
Newspapers established in 1989